Kristian Sirum Novak (born 19 October 1998) is a Norwegian footballer who plays as a defender for Östersund.

Career
Novak played youth football at Austrått and Ålgård, before starting his senior career with the latter in 2014. Ahead of the 2017 season, he joined Viking's youth setup. A year later he was promoted to the senior squad, but a knee injury kept him on the sideline for most of the 2018 season. In 2019, he moved to Sola, and then Grorud. After two seasons with Grorud, he signed a contract with Jerv in January 2021. On 3 April 2022, he made his Eliteserien debut in a 1–0 win against Strømsgodset.

Personal life
He is the son of a Norwegian mother and Croatian father. He hails from Håbafjell in Sandnes and is the older brother of Norwegian international handballer Kristina Novak.

References

External links

1998 births
Living people
People from Sandnes
Norwegian people of Croatian descent
Association football defenders
Norwegian footballers
Norway youth international footballers
Ålgård FK players
Viking FK players
Sola FK players
Grorud IL players
FK Jerv players
Norwegian Third Division players
Norwegian Second Division players
Norwegian First Division players
Eliteserien players
Sportspeople from Rogaland